Víctor Manuel Cruz Gil (December 24, 1957 – September 26, 2004) was a Major League Baseball pitcher. He played during five seasons at the major league level for the Toronto Blue Jays, Cleveland Indians, Pittsburgh Pirates, and Texas Rangers.

Cruz represented the Dominican Republic at the 1975 Pan American Games, and afterward was signed by the St. Louis Cardinals as an amateur free agent in 1976. Cruz played his first professional season with their rookie league Johnson City Cardinals, then split 1977 with the Arkansas Travelers and St. Petersburg Cardinals. After the 1977 season, he was traded to the Toronto Blue Jays with Tom Underwood for John Scott and Pete Vuckovich. Cruz spent the first half of 1978 with the Triple-A Syracuse Chiefs, where he had a 3–2 win–loss record and a 4.50 earned run average (ERA) in 25 games. He made his major league debut on June 24, and spent the rest of the season with the Blue Jays, finishing the year with a 7–3 record and a 1.71 ERA in 32 games. After the season ended, Cruz was traded to the Cleveland Indians for Phil Lansford and Alfredo Griffin.

Upon joining the Indians, Cruz modified his pitching style closer to that of Luis Tiant; the media had noted at the time that the two also had identical mustaches. Cruz spent the full season with the Indians, finishing the year with a 3–9 record and a 4.23 ERA in 61 games. He followed that up with a 6–7 record and a 3.55 ERA in 55 games in 1980. After the 1980 season, Gary Alexander, Bob Owchinko, Rafael Vasquez and Cruz were traded to the Pittsburgh Pirates for Manny Sanguillen and Bert Blyleven. Cruz began the season in the minor leagues, but was brought up to the Pirates' main roster, where he had a 1–1 record and a 2.65 ERA in 22 games.

After the 1981 season, Cruz was traded to the Texas Rangers for Nelson Norman. Cruz spent 1982 with the Denver Bears and 1983 with the Oklahoma City 89ers. After a 2.16 ERA in 30 games for Oklahoma City, he was promoted to the Rangers' major league squad, as the Rangers felt that he had both his pitching and weight under control, he had lost 39 pounds during the previous offseason. In his final major league season, Cruz had a 1–3 record with a 1.44 ERA in 17 games. His final two professional baseball seasons were spent with the Oklahoma City 89ers in 1984, and the Detroit Tigers' Triple-A Nashville Sounds in 1985.

Cruz died from liver problems in his native Dominican Republic on September 26, 2004, at the age of 46.

References

External links

1957 births
2004 deaths
Águilas Cibaeñas players
Arkansas Travelers players
Baseball players at the 1975 Pan American Games
Cleveland Indians players
Denver Bears players
Dominican Republic expatriate baseball players in Canada
Dominican Republic expatriate baseball players in Mexico
Dominican Republic expatriate baseball players in the United States
Johnson City Cardinals players
Major League Baseball pitchers
Major League Baseball players from the Dominican Republic
Mexican League baseball pitchers
Nashville Sounds players
Oklahoma City 89ers players
Pan American Games competitors for the Dominican Republic
Pittsburgh Pirates players
Portland Beavers players
Rojos del Águila de Veracruz players
St. Petersburg Cardinals players
Sultanes de Monterrey players
Syracuse Chiefs players
Texas Rangers players
Toronto Blue Jays players